Kamarul Effandi bin Abdul Rahim (born 12 April 1987) is a Malaysian professional football player who plays for BRM FC as a goalkeeper.

Club career

Early career
Born in Perak, Malaysia, Kamarul started his career with Perak youth team. He has been promoted to Perak first team for the 2008 season after helping the Perak youth team to win the Malaysia President Cup in 2007.

Kamarul also represented the state team in Sukma Games 2010. He was the Perak second choice goalkeeper, previously as understudy to Megat Amir Faisal and then deputising for Nasril Nourdin when Megat left Perak after 2010 season. He was released by Perak, together with Nasril, at the end of the 2012 season. Kamarul joined Sime Darby along with four other former Perak players for the 2013 season.

After three seasons with Sime Darby, he joined Malaysia Premier League side Kuala Lumpur FA in 2017. With Kuala Lumpur, he helped the team win the 2017 Malaysia Premier League title, and promotion to Malaysia Super League. He was Kuala Lumpur's main goalkeeper for the 2018 Malaysia Super League season, and were criticized for howlers that cost the team in the early stages of the league. But Kamarul later improved with several good performances, including keeping a clean sheet in the win over defending champions Johor Darul Ta'zim F.C.

Career statistics

International career
Kamarul was also called to the Malaysia U-23 centralised training under K. Rajagopal in 2009. However Kamarul never made any appearances at international level.

References

External links
 

1987 births
Living people
Malaysian people of Malay descent
Malaysian footballers
People from Perak
Perak F.C. players
Kuala Lumpur City F.C. players
Sime Darby F.C. players
Malaysia Super League players
Association football goalkeepers